Peleciini is a tribe of ground beetles in the family Carabidae. There are about 8 genera and more than 90 described species in Peleciini. They are found mainly in the southern hemisphere.

Genera
These eight genera belong to the tribe Peleciini:
 Agonica Sloane, 1920  (Australia)
 Ardistomopsis Straneo & Ball, 1989  (India, Sri Lanka)
 Disphericus G.R.Waterhouse, 1842  (Africa)
 Dyschiridium Chaudoir, 1861  (Africa, Vietnam)
 Eripus Dejean, 1829  (Mexico, Central and South America)
 Pelecium Kirby, 1819  (Central and South America)
 Pseudagonica B.Moore, 1960  (Australia)
 Stricteripus Straneo & Ball, 1989  (South America)

References

Panagaeinae